This is a list of Orthoptera found in the wild of the Korean Peninsula and surrounding islands.

Grasshoppers

Phasmatodea

Notoptera

Most of grylloblattids are unrecorded or unidentified species.

Ensifera

Cockroaches and Termites

Mantodea

References

Bibliography
 
 
 

List Kor
Orthoptera